The 2011–12 Liga Națională was the 54th season of Romanian Women's Handball League, the top-level women's professional handball league. The league comprises 14 teams. Oltchim Râmnicu Vâlcea were the defending champions, for the fifth season in a row.

Teams 2011–2012 

CSM București
HCM Baia Mare
Corona Braşov
SCM Craiova
Dunărea Brăila
Oltchim Râmnicu Vâlcea
Danubius Galaţi
CSM Ploieşti
HCM Roman
Universitatea Jolidon Cluj-Napoca
HC Zalău
CSU Neptun Constanţa
CSM Cetate Devatrans Deva
Știința Bacău

Standings 

Liga Națională (women's handball)
2011 in Romanian women's sport
2012 in Romanian women's sport
2011–12 domestic women's handball leagues